Commodore George Hamilton Perkins is a public memorial that stands on the grounds of the New Hampshire State House in Concord, New Hampshire, United States. The statue was designed by sculptor Daniel Chester French, with architect Henry Bacon designing the remainder of the public monument. It honors George H. Perkins, a New Hampshire native who had served as an officer in the United States Navy during the American Civil War. The statue was dedicated in 1902.

History

Background and creation 
George H. Perkins was born in Hopkinton, New Hampshire in 1836. During the American Civil War, he served in the United States Navy as a naval officer. Serving under David Farragut, he was noted for his involvement in the Capture of New Orleans and the Battle of Mobile Bay, prompting Farragut to refer to Perkins as "the bravest man that ever trod the deck of a ship". He died on October 28, 1899.

On November 22 of that year, Isabel Weld Perkins (his daughter) offered New Hampshire Governor Frank W. Rollins, on behalf of the state, a statue of her father as the basis for a public memorial. The governor and Executive Council of New Hampshire voted to approve the donation and a portion of the grounds of the New Hampshire State House was set aside for a memorial to Perkins. Daniel Chester French, a New Hampshire native, was chosen to sculpt the statue, with Henry Bacon serving as the architect for the memorial. The bronze statue was cast by the Henry Bonnard Bronze Company.

Dedication 
The dedication ceremony for the completed memorial was held on April 25, 1902. Three large seating platforms were arranged around the memorial to hold over a thousand spectators. Members of the Grand Army of the Republic were given their own stands, while another platform was reserved for members of Nevers' 2nd Regiment Band and a choir that included members of St. Paul's Episcopal Church and the Concord Oratorio Society, among others. In total, over 10,000 spectators partook in the dedication. Guests of honor at the ceremony included Commander William S. Cowles (as a representative for U.S. President Theodore Roosevelt), Rear Admiral John Grimes Walker (representing U.S. Secretary of the Navy John Davis Long), and several other politicians and military officials. These guests were received by Governor Chester B. Jordan, while former Governor Rollins served as the master of ceremonies.

The ceremony began with the choir singing "Our God, Our Help in Ages Past", followed by a prayer given by the Reverend Daniel C. Roberts of St. Paul's Episcopal Church. Following this, Isabel, escorted by her uncle, unveiled the statue, which was covered by an American flag. Following this, an 11-gun salute was given by a company of the New Hampshire National Guard and the band played "Under the Double Eagle". Rear Admiral George Belknap then presented the statue to the state and gave a speech on Perkins. The statue was accepted by Governor Jordan, who proceeded to give an address. After his speech, the band played "From All that Dwell Below the Skies" and President William Jewett Tucker of Dartmouth College gave another speech. After this, the band played "America" and "The Star-Spangled Banner" and Bishop William Woodruff Niles of the Episcopal Diocese of New Hampshire gave a benediction. As part of the closing of the ceremony, another 11-gun salute was performed.

Replica 
On May 29, 1911, a replica of the statue of Perkins was unveiled at the United States Naval Academy. It is located in Bancroft Hall on a balcony that overlooks the Chesapeake Bay.

Design 

The memorial consists of a bronze statue of Perkins surrounded by a granite and Tennessee marble structure. Pedestals mark the ends of this exedra. The statue is situated in a niche within the structure, standing on a granite block that has been shaped to resemble a ship's prow. Atop the niche is a keystone which has allegorical depictions of Peace and War in bas-reliefs. On either side of the niche are depictions of an eagle atop a Doric column with a seal imposed on the column. On one side, it depicts the seal of New Hampshire, while on the other side, the seal of the United States Naval Academy.

Perkins is depicted in full dress uniform, with his left hand resting on the hilt of his sword while his right hand holds his hat. In addition to the statue, there are also two bronze tablets located at either end of the exedra which depict scenes from the Battle of Mobile Bay and the Capture of New Orleans. The Mobile Bay tablet bears the inscription "MOBILE BAY / AUGUST V. MCDDLXIV / AFTER A SEVERE BATTLE WITH THE / CHICKASAW THE / TENNESSEE SURRENDERED", while the New Orleans tablet says "APRIL XXIV MDCCCLXII / IN THE MISSISSIPPI RIVER / BELOW FORT ST PHILIP THE / CAYUGA DEFEATED THREE REBEL / GUNBOATS INCLUDING THE GOVERNOR / MOORE AND THE RAM MANASSAS". A tablet located on the rear of the memorial describes the donation of the statue, with an inscription reading "ERECTED IN LOVING MEMORY / BY HIS / WIFE AND DAUGHTER". Foundry marks are also present on the rear of the memorial.

Beneath the statue is the following inscription:

Additionally, the following inscription is located in front of the statue:

It is located on the west side of the State House, facing North State Street. However, following an enlargement of the building in 1910, the outside wall of the State House comes out to the memorial, making it impossible to read the donation tablet on the memorial's rear.

See also 
 Public sculptures by Daniel Chester French

References

Bibliography

External links 

 
 

1902 establishments in New Hampshire
1902 sculptures
Bronze sculptures in New Hampshire
Buildings and structures in Merrimack County, New Hampshire
Outdoor sculptures in New Hampshire
Sculptures by Daniel Chester French
Sculptures of men in New Hampshire
Statues in New Hampshire
Tourist attractions in Concord, New Hampshire
Union (American Civil War) monuments and memorials in New Hampshire